Christian Friedrich Lautenschlager (April 13, 1877 – January 3, 1954) was a German Grand Prix motor racing driver.

Biography
Born in the village of Magstadt, Baden-Württemberg, Germany near Stuttgart, Christian Lautenschlager was 14 years old when he began training for a career as a machinist at a company in Stuttgart. After a few jobs, he spent time traveling around Europe, returning to Stuttgart in 1899 at the age 22 where he found work at the Daimler factory. There, he worked his way up to the positions of mechanic and then of test driver for the company's race cars.

In 1908, Lautenschlager was given the opportunity to drive one of three Mercedes race vehicles, and he drove it to victory in the French Grand Prix at Dieppe, France. He returned to his factory job rather than joining the racing circuit as a permanent driver. In 1914, driving a Mercedes 37/95, he won the Elgin Trophy in Elgin, Illinois. He raced only a few more times until he achieved great fame at Lyon, France, on July 4, 1914 by winning the 1914 French Grand Prix. As the assassination in Sarajevo had happened days earlier, international tensions were high, and this was the last Grand Prix before World War I started.

Considered one of the great Grand Prix events in motor-racing history, 37 cars from 13 manufacturers in 6 different countries competed in the French Grand Prix race that for the first time had a limit on the size of the engine allowed, set at 4.5 litres. Against a top field led by Frenchman Georges Boillot, who had won the race the past two years, after seven gruelling hours, Lautenschlager took victory in the prestigious event for the second time. The onset of World War I ended Grand Prix motor racing in Europe.

In the early 1920s, when Lautenschlager was in his 40s, he raced on a semi-regular basis but without much success. He competed in the 1922 Targa Florio, finishing in tenth place. In 1923, he traveled to the United States to compete in the Indianapolis 500 as part of a three-car Mercedes team. Driving vehicles equipped with the first supercharged engine in the race's history, their effort proved less than successful and Lautenschlager finished 23rd. The following year brought no victories, and he retired from racing.

Christian Lautenschlager worked for Daimler until his retirement. He died at the age of 76 in Untertürkheim, a suburb of Stuttgart.

Indy 500 results

1877 births
1954 deaths
Indianapolis 500 drivers
German racing drivers
Grand Prix drivers
Mercedes-Benz
People from Böblingen (district)
Sportspeople from Stuttgart (region)
Racing drivers from Baden-Württemberg